C News is a leading monthly information and communications technology (ICT) magazine of Bangladesh.  In print since 2001, it is the second most circulated ICT magazine in Bangladesh.  C News also runs an ICT web portal which is updated daily with news, views, and analysis on various aspects of ICT.

External links

2001 establishments in Bangladesh
Magazines published in Bangladesh
Computer magazines
Magazines established in 2001